Sarkan-e Sofla (also Romanized as Sarkān-e Soflá; also known as Sarkān-e Pā‘īn) is a village in Holayjan Rural District, in the Central District of Izeh County, Khuzestan Province, Iran. At the 2006 census, its population was 27, in 4 families.

References 

Populated places in Izeh County